The Faculty of Medicine, Thammasat University is a medical school in Thailand in Khlong Luang District, Pathum Thani Province. It is the eleventh faculty of Thammasat University and ninth medical school set up in Thailand.

History 
Thammasat University laid plans to build a faculty to teach medicine in 1979. The project was initiated in 1986 when the construction of Thammasat University Hospital was started. The council of the university then approved the construction of a Faculty of Medicine in August 1988, followed by cabinet approval on 30 January 1990 and finally by royal decree of King Bhumibol Adulyadej on 19 March 1990.

In the 2018 academic year, Thammasat accepted a total of 170 students for the MD course, separated into 105 students under the Collaborative Project to Increase Production of Rural Doctor (CPIRD) and 65 students under the Consortium of Thai Medical Schools Examination (กสพท). In the same year, the faculty also accepted 30 students for the BSc. Applied Thai Traditional Medicine course.

Departments 

 Preclinical Science
 Department of Anatomy
 Department of Physiology
 Department of Parasitology
 Department of Pharmacology
 Department of Microbiology and Immunity
 Department of Biochemistry
 Department of Cell Biology
 Department of Molecular Genetics and Medical Molecular Biology
 Clinical Science
 Department of Medicine
 Department of Paediatrics
 Department of Surgery
 Department of Obstetrics and Gynaecology
 Department of Orthopaedics
 Department of Anaesthesiology
 Department of Otolaryngology
 Department of Rehabilitation Medicine
 Department of Emergency Medicine
 Department of Radiology
 Department of Ophthalmology
 Department of Pathology and Forensic Science
 Department of Psychiatry
 Department of Epidemiology
 Community Medicine and Family Medicine Center
 Graduate School
 Biochemistry and Molecular Biology
 Applied Thai Traditional Medicine Center

Teaching hospitals 
 Thammasat University Hospital
 Saraburi Hospital (CPIRD)
 Chumphon Khet Udomsakdi Hospital (CPIRD)
 Surat Thani Hospital (CPIRD)
 Buddhasothorn Hospital (CPIRD)

See also 

 List of medical schools in Thailand

References 

 Article incorporates material from the corresponding article in the Thai Wikipedia

Thammasat University
Medical schools in Thailand
University departments in Thailand